These ornaments are attached through a piercing in the nostril.

Nostril ring origins 
The Middle East is the birthplace of the nostril ring, with the first record of nostril piercings tracing back 4,000 years. In the book of Genesis, Abraham’s servant gifts young Rebekah an array of jewellery as a marriage offering on behalf of her future husband, Isaac. Among the gifts and trinkets was a golden earring called a “Shanf” also known as a nose ring.

Hindu tradition 

The nose ring, called a Nath in various Indian languages, is referenced in early Hindu Vedic texts and became popular around the 9th and 10th centuries becoming a symbol of a woman's marital status. The Nath in its full form - with a chain connected to a hairpiece or earring - is traditionally worn by a Hindu woman on her wedding day to honour and pay reverence to the Goddess, Parvati, consort to Shiva.

The "Nath" also displays economic status amongst Hindus; wives of kings, ministers and wealthy families wore naths made of pearls, sapphire and kundan while others wore those made of silver. From the 15th century onwards, the ornament became quite popular, and saw variations of using clove, thorns, and nails during the 17th and 18th centuries. Contemporary designs and materials arrived in the 20th century.

See also 
 Nose piercing

References 

 

Hinduism

Types of jewellery
Jewellery of India